Pygidianops is a genus of pencil catfishes native to South America.

Species
There are currently four recognized species in this genus:
 Pygidianops amphioxus de Pinna & Kirovsky, 2011
 Pygidianops cuao Schaefer, Provenzano, de Pinna & Baskin, 2005
 Pygidianops eigenmanni Myers, 1944
 Pygidianops magoi Schaefer, Provenzano, de Pinna & Baskin, 2005

Distribution
P. eigenmanni is from the Rio Negro basin in Brazil. P. cuao is known only from Cuao River drainage basin. P. magoi is known only from lower Orinoco mainstem between Ciudad Bolívar and Barrancas in Venezuela.

Description
Species of Pygidianops share the extreme reduction of pigmentation, loss of the dorsal fin, the loss or extreme reduction of pectoral fins, a reduced lateral line, and the reduction or complete loss of eyes in some species. These fish are markedly miniaturized, yet retain a relatively well-ossified skeleton comparable in both bone differentiation and degree of calcification to that observed in larger trichomycterids.

P. cuao is distinguished from congeners by the presence of diminutive eyes (vs. eyes absent in both other species), posterior naris absent (vs. nares bilaterally paired), and the presence of a triangular skin flap at mouth corner (vs. skin flap absent). P. magoi is distinguished from all congeners by the absence of pectoral and anal fins (vs. fins present), posterior naris absent (vs. present, nares bilaterally paired), four laterosensory pores on the head (vs. six), and by the presence of 9–10 caudal fin rays (vs. 12–13). With all of its fins lost except the caudal fin, P. magoi represents the most extreme fin loss among ostariophysans. P. eigenmanni lacks eyes but has its anal and pectoral fins.

References

Trichomycteridae
Fish of South America
Fish of Brazil
Fish of Venezuela
Freshwater fish genera
Catfish genera
Taxa named by George S. Myers